Xu Haifeng (born August 1, 1957) is a male Chinese pistol shooter, and he is the first citizen of the People's Republic of China to win a gold medal at the Summer Olympics. He specializes in the 50 metre pistol event. He was born in Zhangzhou, Fujian and is a native of He County, Anhui.

The first gold medal for China was won by Xu in the 1984 Los Angeles Olympics, while his teammate Wang Yifu won bronze. After retiring in 1995, he became a coach for the Chinese National Shooting Team.

Xu was the torchbearer to bring the Olympic Torch into the Beijing National Stadium, near the end of the 2008 Summer Olympics Opening Ceremony. Xu is married to Zhao Lei, the daughter of his coach in the Chinese National Shooting Team. They have a daughter, Xu Jia. Xu is the Deputy Director of Chinese Cycling and Fencing Administration Centre.

Portrayals and coverage in media 
On October 14, 2012 a movie based on his life leading up to his Olympic gold medal, "Xu Haifeng and his Gun"  premiered in China.  The movie was directed by Wang Fangfang and stars Li Dongxue as Xu Haifeng.

References

Profile - China Daily

1957 births
Living people
ISSF pistol shooters
Olympic bronze medalists for China
Olympic gold medalists for China
Olympic shooters of China
Sportspeople from Zhangzhou
Shooters at the 1984 Summer Olympics
Shooters at the 1988 Summer Olympics
National team coaches
Olympic medalists in shooting
Asian Games medalists in shooting
Sport shooters from Fujian
Shooters at the 1986 Asian Games
Shooters at the 1990 Asian Games
Shooters at the 1994 Asian Games
Chinese male sport shooters
Medalists at the 1988 Summer Olympics
Medalists at the 1984 Summer Olympics
Asian Games gold medalists for China
Medalists at the 1986 Asian Games
Medalists at the 1990 Asian Games
Medalists at the 1994 Asian Games
20th-century Chinese people